This article lists expulsions, refugee crises and other forms of displacement that have affected Jews.

Timeline

The following is a list of Jewish expulsions and events that prompted significant streams of Jewish refugees.

Assyrian captivity

733/2 BCE Tiglath-Pileser III, King of the Neo-Assyrian Empire, sacked the northern Kingdom of Israel and annexed the territory of the tribes of Reuben, Gad and Manasseh in Gilead. People from these tribes were taken captive and resettled in the region of the Khabur River, in Halah, Habor, Hara and Gozan. Tiglath-Pileser also captured the territory of Naphtali and the city of Janoah in Ephraim, and an Assyrian governor was placed over the region of Naphtali.

722 BCE In 722 BCE, Samaria, the capital city of the northern Kingdom of Israel, was taken by Sargon II, who resettled the Israelites in Halah, Habor, Gozan and in the cities of Media. Sargon recorded the capture of that city thus: "Samaria I looked at, I captured; 27,280 men who dwelt in it I carried away" into Assyria. Some people of the northern tribes were spared, and it has been suggested that many also fled south to Jerusalem.

Babylonian Captivity 

597 BCE In 598 BCE, Nebuchadnezzar II of the Neo-Babylonian Empire besieged Jerusalem, then capital of the southern Kingdom of Judah. The city fell after a three-month siege, and the new king Jeconiah, who was either 8 or 18, his court and other prominent citizens (including the prophet Ezekiel) and craftsmen, were deported to Babylon. Jehoiakim's uncle Zedekiah was appointed king in his place.

587-586 BCE 
 When Zedekiah revolted against Babylonian rule, Nebuchadnezzar responded by invading Judah. In December 589 BCE, Nebuchadnezzar began another siege of Jerusalem. During the siege, many Jews fled to surrounding Moab, Ammon, Edom and other countries to seek refuge. The city eventually fell after a thirty-month siege, and the Babylonian general Nebuzaradan was sent to complete its destruction. The city was plundered, and Solomon's Temple was destroyed. Most of the members of the elite class were taken into captivity in Babylon. The city was razed. Only a few people were permitted to remain and tend to the land.: In 537 BCE Cyrus the Great, the founding king of the Achaemenid Persian Empire, allowed the Jews to return to Judah and rebuild the Temple.

500-1 BCE 
139 BCE Expulsion from the city of Rome under the accusation of aggressive proselytizing among the Romans.

1-599 CE 
19 CE Expulsion from the city of Rome by Emperor Tiberius together with practitioners of the Egyptian religion.

38 CE Jews were expelled from one of their quarters in the city of Alexandria, in Egypt, under the instigation of Aulus Avilius Flaccus. 

41-53 CE Claudius' expulsion of Jews from Rome.

73 CE The Jewish defeat in the First Jewish–Roman War led to many Jews being taken prisoner and enslaved or becoming refugees.

119 Large Jewish communities of Cyprus, Cyrene and Alexandria obliterated after the Jewish defeat in Kitos War against Rome. This event caused a major demographic shift in the Levant and North Africa. According to Eusebius of Caesarea the outbreak of violence left Libya depopulated to such an extent that a few years later new colonies had to be established there by the emperor Hadrian just to maintain the viability of continued settlement.

415 Jews expelled from Alexandria under the leadership of Saint Cyril of Alexandria.

418 Jews expelled from Minorca or asked to convert.

Sixth to tenth centuries
612 Visigothic king Sisebut mandated that every Jew who would refuse for over a year to have himself or his children and servants baptized would be banished from the country and deprived of his possessions.

629 The entire Jewish population of Galilee massacred or expelled, following the Jewish rebellion against Byzantium.

7th century Muhammad expelled two Jewish tribes: the Banu Qaynuqa and Banu Nadir from Medina. The Banu Qurayza tribe was slaughtered and the Jewish settlement of Khaybar was ransacked.

Eleventh to thirteenth centuries
1012 Jews expelled from Mainz.

1095–mid-13th century The waves of Crusades destroyed many Jewish communities in Europe (most notably in Rhineland) and in the Middle East (most notably in Jerusalem).

Mid-12th century The invasion of Almohades brought to end the Golden age of Jewish culture in Spain. Among other refugees was Maimonides, who fled to Morocco, then Egypt, then Eretz Israel.

1276 Jews expelled from Upper Bavaria.

12th–14th centuries France. The practice of expelling the Jews accompanied by confiscation of their property, followed by temporary readmissions for ransom, was used to enrich the crown: expulsions from Paris by Philip Augustus in 1182, from France by Louis IX in 1254, by Philip IV in 1306, by Charles IV in 1322, by Charles V in 1359, by Charles VI in 1394.

13th century The influential philosopher and logician Ramon Llull (1232–1315) called for expulsion of all Jews who would refuse conversion to Christianity. Some scholars regard Llull's as the first comprehensive articulation, in the Christian West, of an expulsionist policy regarding Jews.

1253 On July 23 (Menachem Av 25) the Jews of Vienne, France were expelled by order of Pope Innocent III

1288 Naples issues first expulsion of Jews in Southern Italy.

1290 King Edward I of England issues the Edict of Expulsion for all Jews from England. The policy was reversed after 365 years in 1655 by Oliver Cromwell.

1294 On June 24 (4th of Tamuz), the Jews of Berne, Switzerland were expelled  "Several Jews were put to death there in consequence of a blood libel" but a deal involving the Jews paying money reverted the expulsion.

14th century 
1360 Jews expelled from Hungary by Louis I of Hungary.

1392 Jews expelled from Bern, Switzerland. Although between 1408 and 1427 Jews were again residing in the city, the only Jews to appear in Bern subsequently were transients, chiefly physicians and cattle dealers.

15th century 
1420-21 Duke Albert V orders the imprisonment and forcible conversion to Christianity of all Jews in Austria. Some convert and others leave the country. In 1421 Austrian authorities again arrest and expel Jews and Jews are banned from the capital Vienna.

1442 Jews again expelled from Upper Bavaria.

1478 Jews expelled from Passau.

1491 Jews of Ravenna expelled, synagogues destroyed.

1492 Ferdinand II and Isabella I issued the Alhambra decree, General Edict on the Expulsion of the Jews from Spain (approx. 200,000) and from Sicily (1493, approx. 37,000). 

1495 Charles VIII of France occupies Kingdom of Naples, bringing new persecution against Jews, many of whom were refugees from Spain.

1496 Jews expelled from Portugal. Maximilian I, Holy Roman Emperor, issues a decree expelling all Jews from Styria and Wiener Neustadt.

1499 Jews expelled from Nuremberg.

16th century 
1510 Jews expelled from Naples.
1510 Jews expelled from Brandenburg after a false accusation of host desecration in Berlin. 

1519 Jews expelled from Regensburg.

1526 Jews expelled from Pressburg (Bratislava) in the wake of the defeat of the Kingdom of Hungary by the Ottoman Empire.

1551 All remaining Jews expelled from the duchy of Bavaria. Jewish settlement in Bavaria ceased until toward the end of the 17th century, when a small community was founded in Sulzbach by refugees from Vienna.

1569 Pope Pius V expels Jews from the papal states, except for Ancona and Rome.

1593 Pope Clement VIII expels Jews living in all the papal states, except Rome, Avignon and Ancona. Jews are invited to settle in Leghorn, the main port of Tuscany, where they are granted full religious liberty and civil rights, by the Medici family, who want to develop the region into a center of commerce.

1597 Nine hundred Jews were expelled from Milan.

17th century 
1614 Fettmilch Uprising: Jews are expelled from Frankfurt, Holy Roman Empire, following the plundering of the Judengasse.

1654The fall of the Dutch colony of Recife in Brazil to the Portuguese prompted the Jewish arrival in New Amsterdam, the first group of Jews to flee to North America.

1669-1670 Jews expelled from Vienna by Leopold I, Holy Roman Emperor and subsequently forbidden to settle in the Austrian Hereditary Lands. The former Jewish ghetto on the Unterer Werd was renamed Leopoldstadt in honour of the emperor and the expropriated houses and land given to Catholic citizens.

1679–1680 Jews all throughout Yemen expelled from their towns and villages and sent to a desert place, in what is known as the Mawza Exile.

1683 Jews expelled from Haiti and all of the other French colonies, due to the Code Noir decree issued by Louis XIV.

18th century 
1701–1714 War of the Spanish Succession. After the war, Jews of Austrian origin were expelled from Bavaria, but some were able to acquire the right to reside in Munich.

1744–1790s The reforms of Frederick II, Joseph II and Maria Theresa sent masses of impoverished German and Austrian Jews east.

1791 The tzarina of Russia Catherine the Great institutes the Pale of Settlement, restricting Jews to the western parts of the empire by means of deportation. By the late 19th century, over four million Jews would live in the Pale.

19th century 
1862 Tennessee, Mississippi, Kentucky Jews expelled by Ulysses S. Grant by General Order No. 11.

1880-1910s Pogroms in the Russian Empire: around 2.5 million Jews emigrated from eastern Europe, mostly to the United States.

20th century 
1917
 Jews expelled from the area of Jaffa by Ottoman authorities during World War I.

1933–1957The Nazi German persecution started with the Nazi boycott of Jewish businesses in 1933, reached a first climax during Kristallnacht in 1938 and culminated in the Holocaust of European Jewry. The British Mandate of Palestine prohibited Jewish emigration to Mandatory Palestine. The 1938 Evian Conference, the 1943 Bermuda Conference and other attempts failed to resolve the problem of Jewish refugees, a fact widely used in Nazi propaganda. A small number of German and Austrian Jewish refugees from Nazism emigrated to Britain, where attitudes were not necessarily positive. Many of the refugees fought for Britain in the Second World War. After WW-II, eastern European Holocaust survivors migrated to the allied-controlled part of Europe, as the Jewish society to which most of them belonged did not exist anymore. Often they were lone survivors consumed by the often futile search for other family and friends, and often unwelcome in the towns from which they came. They were known as displaced persons (also known as Sh'erit ha-Pletah) and placed in displaced persons camps, most of which were by 1951 closed. The last camp Föhrenwald was closed in 1957.

1943-1944 Jews are expelled, their citizenship is stripped from them and they are subjected to pogroms in some Italian cities, including Rome, Verona, Florence, Pisa and Alessandria.

1947–1972The Jewish exodus from the Muslim world, in which the combined population of the Jewish communities of the Middle East and North Africa (excluding Israel) was reduced from about 900,000 in 1948 to under 8,000 today, and approximately 600,000 of them became citizens of Israel. The history of the exodus is politicized, given its proposed relevance to a final settlement to the Israeli–Palestinian peace negotiations. When presenting the history, those who view the Jewish exodus as equivalent to the 1948 Palestinian exodus, such as the Israeli government and NGOs such as JJAC and JIMENA, emphasize "push factors", such as cases of anti-Jewish violence and forced expulsions, and refer to those affected as "refugees". Those who argue that the exodus does not equate to the Palestinian exodus emphasize "pull factors", such as the actions of local Jewish Agency for Israel officials aiming to fulfil the One Million Plan, highlight good relations between the Jewish communities and their country's governments, emphasize the impact of other push factors such as the decolonization in the Maghreb and the Suez War and Lavon Affair in Egypt, and argue that many or all of those who left were not refugees.

Then UNHCR announced in February 1957 and in July 1967, that these Jews who had fled from Arab countries "may be considered prima facie within the mandate of this office," so according them in international law, as bona fide refugees.

1947 Egypt passed the Companies' Law. This law required that no less than 75% of employees of companies in Egypt must be Egyptian citizens. This law strongly affected Jews, as only about 20% of all Jews in Egypt were Egyptian citizens. The rest, although in many cases born in Egypt and living there for generations, did not hold Egyptian citizenship.

1948 State of Israel established. Antisemitism in Egypt strongly intensified. On May 15, 1948, emergency law was declared, and a royal decree forbade Egyptian citizens to leave the country without a special permit. This was applied to Jews. Hundreds of Jews were arrested and many had their property confiscated. In June through August 1948, bombs were planted in Jewish neighborhoods and Jewish businesses looted. About 250 Jews were killed or wounded by the bombs. Roughly 14,000 Jews left Egypt between 1948 and 1950.

1949 Jordan occupies and then annexes the West Bank – largely allotted by the 1947 UN Partition of Palestine to an Arab state, proposal rejected by the Arab leadership – and conducts large scale discrimination and persecution of all non-Muslim residents – Jewish, Christian (of many denominations), Druze, Circassian, etc. – and forces Arabisation of all public activity, including schools and public administration.

1951-1952 During Operation Ezra and Nehemiah, ~120,000 Jews Expelled under the De-Naturalization Act of Iraqi PM Tawfeeq Al-Suwaidi due to Jews having too much influence over the economy.

1954 Gamal Abdel Nasser seizes power in Egypt. Nasser immediately arrested many Jews who were tried on various charges, mainly for Zionist and communist activities. Jews were forced to donate large sums of money to the military. Strict supervision of Jewish enterprises was introduced; some were confiscated and others forcibly sold to the government.

1956 Suez Crisis. Roughly 3,000 Egyptian Jews were interned without charge in four detention camps. The government ordered thousands of Jews to leave the country within a few days, and they were not allowed to sell their property, nor to take any capital with them. The deportees were made to sign statements agreeing not to return to Egypt and transferring their property to the administration of the government. The International Red Cross helped about 8,000 stateless Jews to leave the country, taking most of them to Italy and Greece. Most of the Jews of Port Said (about 100) were smuggled to Israel by Israel agents. The system of deportation continued into 1957. Other Jews left voluntarily, after their livelihoods had been taken from them, until only 8,561 were registered in the 1957 census.  The Jewish exodus continued until there were about 3,000 Jews left as of in 1967.

1962
Jews flee Algeria as result of OAS violence. The community feared that the proclamation of independence would precipitate a Muslim outburst. By the end of July 1962, 70,000 Jews had left for France and another 5,000 for Israel. It is estimated that some 80% of Algerian Jews settled in France.

1965
Situation of Jews in Algeria rapidly deteriorates. By 1969, fewer than 1,000 Jews remain. By the 1990s, the numbers had dwindled to approximately 70.

1967 Six-Day War. Hundreds of Egyptian Jews arrested, suffering beatings, torture, and abuse. Some were released following intervention by foreign states, especially by Spain, and were permitted to leave the country. Libyan Jews, who numbered approximately 7,000, were subjected to pogroms in which 18 were killed, prompting a mass exodus that left fewer than 100 Jews in Libya.

19681968 Polish political crisis forced thousands of Jews to leave communist Poland.

1970
Less than 1,000 Jews still lived in Egypt in 1970. They were given permission to leave but without their possessions. As of 1971, only 400 Jews remained in Egypt. As of 2013, only a few dozen Jews remain in Egypt.
1970s–1990s State-sponsored persecution in the Soviet Union prompted hundreds of thousands of Soviet Jews, known as Refuseniks because they had been denied official permission to leave, to flee; most went to Israel or to the United States as refugees.
1972 Idi Amin, expels all Israelis from Uganda.
1985 and 1991 10,000 Jews fled Ethiopia as part of Operation Moses and Operation Joshua and 14,000 Jews fled Ethiopia as part of Operation Solomon.

21st century 
2003Last Jew left Libya.
2010Contact with last two Jews in Somalia was lost.
2021Last Jew left Afghanistan.
2021Members of Yemen's Jewish community have fled the country, leaving only six reported Jews left, though it is not clear whether they were expelled or left voluntarily as part of an exit agreement with the Houthi movement. One of the expelled family members said: “History will remember us as the last of Yemeni Jews who were still clinging to their homeland until the last moment,” “We had rejected many temptations time and time again, and refused to leave our homeland, but today we are forced.”

Expulsions of Jews by country

See also 

Aliyah
Antisemitism
Geography of antisemitism
Historical Jewish population comparisons
History of antisemitism
Jewish diaspora
Jewish ethnic divisions
Jewish exodus from the Muslim world
Jewish history
Pogrom
Persecution of Jews
Yerida

Notes

References

Citations

Books

External links 
 Ordinary exile, the story of Austrian Jewish refugees in France and in Belgium
 A Lifes Worth of Living by Lys Anzia. WNN - Women News Network
 , a documentary by Pierre Rehov
 Explusions of Jews on Jewish Virtual Library

 
Forced migration
Genocides in Europe